Breña Baja (Spanish for Lower Breña) is a municipality on the eastern side of the island of La Palma, in the province of Santa Cruz de Tenerife, in the Canary Islands. The ayuntamiento (municipal office) is in the town of San José with an elevation of 300 m. Until the 17th century the area was known as Breña, but was then divided into Breña Alta and Breña Baja.

La Palma's second largest resort, Los Cancajos, is on the coast. Part of La Palma Airport (formerly Mazo Airport) is located in the municipality.

Subdivisions
The municipality has 8 subdivisions, or "parishes" (population figures from 2005):

San Antonio (1,128 persons)
San José (1,042 persons)
La Polvacera (672 persons)
Los Cancajos (467 persons)
Las Ledas (321 persons)
El Socorro (309 persons)
La Montaña (257 persons)
El Fuerte (159 persons)

Historical population

See also
List of municipalities in Santa Cruz de Tenerife

References

Municipalities in La Palma